A background artist or sometimes called a background stylist or background painter is one who is involved in the process of animation who establishes the color, style, and mood of a scene drawn by an animation layout artist. The methods used can either be through traditional painting or by digital media such as Adobe Photoshop. Traditional methods involved painting entire production scenes for a television program or film. Current methods may involve painting primarily background keys or the establishing shot while production background artists paint the corresponding background paintings.

Some fields in which a Background Artist may work:
Motion pictures
Television
Video games
The Internet

Other artists who contribute to animated cartoons, but who are not Background Artists, are layout artists (who design the backgrounds, lighting, and camera angles), storyboard artists (who draw panels of the action from the script), character designers (who create the style and personality of each character).

In Japanese animation, the cast member credited as the Art Director (美術監督, bijutsu kantoku) usually refers to the sole background artist (for smaller productions) or director in charge of background art creation.

Background Artists
List of some famous background artists:
 Toby Bluth - Disney
 James Coleman - Disney
 Eyvind Earle - Disney
 Paul Julian - Warner Bros.
 Barry Kooser - Disney, Worker Studio
 Brice Mack - Disney
 Maurice Noble - Warner Bros., MGM Animation
 Kazuo Oga - Studio Ghibli, Madhouse
 Walter Peregoy - Disney, Format Films, Hanna-Barbera
 Tyrus Wong - Disney, Warner Bros.
 Kōji Yamamura - Independent
 Yale Gracey -  Disney
 Ed Starr - Disney
 Thelma Witmer- Disney
 Art Riley -Disney
 Bi Wei Tronolone - Disney
Shinji Kimura - Kobayashi Production

See also
 Matte painting
 Scenography

References

Animation techniques
Visual arts occupations
Background artists